Ulf Carlsson (born 3 June 1949) is a Swedish boxer. He competed in the men's light welterweight event at the 1976 Summer Olympics. At the 1976 Summer Olympics, he lost to Ray Leonard of the United States.

References

External links
 

1949 births
Living people
Swedish male boxers
Olympic boxers of Sweden
Boxers at the 1976 Summer Olympics
Sportspeople from Dalarna County
Light-welterweight boxers
20th-century Swedish people